Texas's 5th congressional district of the United States House of Representatives is in an area that includes a northeast portion of the City of Dallas, Dallas County including Mesquite plus a number of smaller suburban, exurban and rural counties south and east of Dallas, including Anderson, Cherokee, Henderson, Van Zandt, and Kaufman. As of the 2000 census, the 5th district  represents 651,620 people. The current Representative from the 5th district is Lance Gooden, who won re-election in 2020 by defeating Democratic candidate Carolyn Salter.

2012 redistricting
After the 2012 redistricting process, the eastern half of Wood County was removed, and there were slight changes to the district in Dallas County.

Voting

List of representatives
U.S. congressional district borders are periodically redrawn, therefore some district residence locations may no longer be in the 5th district.

Recent elections

2004

2006

2008

2010

2012

2014

2016

2018

2020

Historical district boundaries

See also
List of United States congressional districts

References

 Congressional Biographical Directory of the United States 1774–present

05